Uri: The Surgical Strike is a 2019 Indian Hindi-language military action film written and directed by debutant Aditya Dhar and produced by Ronnie Screwvala under the RSVP Movies banner. A fictionally dramatised account of the true event of the retaliation to the 2016 Uri attack, the film stars Vicky Kaushal along with Yami Gautam, Mohit Raina, Kirti Kulhari and Paresh Rawal in pivotal roles, and tells the story of Major Vihaan Shergill (Vicky Kaushal) of the Para (Special Forces), who played a leading role in the events. 

Screwvala announced the film in September 2017, a year after the 2016 Indian Line of Control strike. The principal photography began from June 2018 in Serbia where it was majorly shot before being wrapped up in September in Mumbai. It was released on 11 January 2019 to critical acclaim from critics and audiences alike, praising the performances of the cast, screenplay, action sequences, sound design, direction and technical aspects and was also a recipient of various accolades including four National Film Awards.

Made on a budget of 25 crore, Uri: The Surgical Strike grossed  ( million) worldwide and went on to become the 29th highest-grossing Indian film ever made. It was declared a 'blockbuster' by Box Office India.

Plot
The film is divided into five chapters.

The Seven Sisters (North-east India)
The first chapter opens up with an ambush in June 2015 on the convoy of the Indian Army troops in Chandel, Manipur by NSCN(K) militants. In retaliation, Major Vihaan Singh Shergill, a Para SF officer and his unit, including his brother-in-law, Major Karan Kashyap, infiltrate and attack the Northeastern militants and also kill the key leader responsible for the ambush. After a successful strike, the Prime Minister of India congratulates him and the whole unit at a formal dinner. Vihaan requests an early retirement as he wants to be close with his mother, who is suffering from Stage VI Alzheimer's, on which the Prime Minister offers him a desk job at New Delhi near his mother instead of retirement, to which he agrees.

An Unsettling Peace (New Delhi, India)
The second chapter shows Vihaan taking a desk job at the Integrated Defence Staff HQ in New Delhi and him spending time with his family. This segment also briefly describes the Pathankot attack. A nurse named Jasmine D'Almeida is assigned to take care of Vihaan's mother. Vihaan meets an Indian Air Force pilot named Flight Lieutenant Seerat Kaur, who is trying to prove her patriotism to her martyred husband, who was an army officer who died in an ambush. One fine day, his mother goes missing. He searches for her, and he blames Jasmine for ignorance and tells Jasmine that there is no need for her security. Vihaan's mother is found under a bridge, and Jasmine reveals herself as an intelligence agent. The film reveals why the families of the special forces soldiers were given security due to the threat from the North-eastern terrorists.

Bleed India with Thousand Cuts (Uri, Jammu Kashmir, India)
On 18 September 2016, four heavily armed militants attack the brigade headquarters at Uri, Jammu and Kashmir at dawn, killing 19 soldiers in their sleep. The terrorists are killed, but Karan dies in a grenade explosion due to accidentally pulling the pin attached to the terrorist's rifle, which he picked up to examine. The whole family becomes devastated, including Vihaan. The Ministry decides to take strict action against the perpetrators of the attack. National Security Advisor Govind Bharadwaj suggests the idea of a surgical strike. The Prime Minister gives it a go and gives ten days for the strike. Vihaan leaves his desk job and leaves for Northern Command base in Udhampur. He requests Chief of the Army Staff General Arjun Singh Rajawat to count him in the operation to which he agrees. Vihaan chooses the elite Ghatak Force commandos from the Bihar Regiment, and the Dogra Regiment along with the special forces as most of the soldiers killed in the attack were from these regiments. Vihaan informs them that they can no longer use their phones and disguises the mission as regular training exercises. The commandos begin their training.

Naya Hindustan (New India) (New Delhi, India) 
During the planning, Govind ropes in ISRO (for providing satellite images), DRDO (for drone surveillance), and RAW (for intelligence). When he goes to meet the DRDO Chief Brian D'Souza, he chances to meet an intern named Ishaan who has developed a drone called Garuda which looks and is shaped like an Eagle. With the help of the drones and satellite images they can get the exact location of the hideouts and training camps of the terrorists. Jasmine reveals her true name as Pallavi Sharma to Vihaan, and during an interrogation, the two extract information about who planned the attack. He chooses Seerat to be his pilot, who agrees wholeheartedly. Govind also suggests intensifying the artillery shelling at the border for distraction and painting their assault helicopters with Pakistani Air Force markings. The commandos also start training under Vihaan. The Pakistani officials suspect the Indian activities but dismiss them due to underestimation.

The strike (POK, Pakistan)
On the night of 28 September, the commandos leave for the strike in Pakistan occupied Kashmir in Mi-17 helicopters. During the mission, Vihaan's helicopter is forced not to cross the Line of Control due to the latest intelligence from spies in Pakistan that the Pakistani Army has deployed an "AWAC" early warning radar-based surface to air missile system in Muzafarabad sector to bring their helicopter down. He and his team improvise by going on foot through a cave (which was very risky due to darkness and the unknown presence of other terrorists). His team successfully infiltrate and kill all the terrorists on the two launchpads. Similarly, other commando teams also manage to kill all of the terrorists. Vihaan kills Idris and Jabbar, who are the perpetrators of the Uri attack. The local police are alerted, and the commandos who are low on ammunition and time escape. On their way back, they are heavily rained down upon by gunfire from both a nearby machine gun bunker and a Pakistani Air Force Mi-17 Helicopter, which was scrambled to intercept Vihaan's team. Flight Lieutenant Seerat comes to their rescue by firing back at the Pakistani gunship, thus driving it away and eliminating the machine gun bunker. His team successfully crosses the LoC on the Indian side with no casualties. The rest of the assigned teams are also successful and are back with no casualties. Vihaan lands at Hindon Air Force Station at Ghaziabad, Uttar Pradesh. The film ends with him, Pallavi, Govind, and the commandos happily having a formal dinner with the Prime Minister.

In a post-credits scene, Zameer, a Pakistani minister, wakes up and shouts in frustration while seeing the news of India's successful surgical strike. The scene cuts to a title card reading "Jai Hind".

Cast

Vicky Kaushal as Major Vihaan Singh Shergill, team leader (Para SF) (character based on Col Kapil Yadav)
Paresh Rawal as National Security Advisor Govind Bhardwaj (character based on Ajit Doval)
Rajit Kapur as Prime Minister of India (character based on Narendra Modi)
Rajvir Chauhan as  Captain Uday Singh Rathod (Para SF officer)
Yami Gautam as Jasmine D'Almeida / Pallavi Sharma, an undercover RAW agent
Kirti Kulhari as Flight Lieutenant Seerat Kaur (IAF officer)
Mohit Raina as Major Karan Kashyap, Vihaan's brother-in-law (Para SF sniper) (character based on Late Colonel MN Rai)
Akashdeep Arora as Ishaan Wattal (Intern at DRDO)
Manasi Parekh as Neha Shergill Kashyap, Karan's wife and Vihaan's sister
Yogesh Soman as Defence Minister of India Ravinder Agnihotri (the character based on Manohar Parrikar)
Swaroop Sampat as Suhasini Shergill, Vihaan's mother
Shishir Sharma as COAS General Arjun Singh Rajawat (the character based on General Dalbir Singh Suhag)
Satyajit Sharma as Lieutenant General Ajay Garewal (the character based on Lieutenant General Deependra Singh Hooda GOC Northern Command (India))
Riva Arora as Suhani Kashyap, Vihaan's niece
Dhairya Karwa as Captain Sartaj Singh Chandhok (Para SF officer)
Padam Bhola as Vikram Dabas (Para SF commando)
Anurag Mishra as K. S. Venkatesh (Para SF commando) 
Navtej Hundal as Home Minister of India (character Based on Rajnath Singh)
Ivan Rodrigues as Brian D'Souza (DRDO chief)
Kamal Malik as Interior Minister of Pakistan
Sukhwinder Chahal as a Pakistani police officer of POK
Ujjwal Chopra as Shahid Khan, Aasma's husband
Rukhsar Rehman as Aasma Khan
Abrar Zahoor as Idris Khan
 Sunil Palwal as Jabbar Firozi
Rakesh Bedi as Senior Pakistani ISI officer
Nishant Singh as Rahil Hussain
Ajit Shidhaye as Zubair Mehmood, a Pakistani army officer
Aamir Yaseen as Pakistani Terrorist
Adarsh Gautam as Afzal Lateef, a Pakistani army officer 
Anil George as Zameer, a Pakistani minister

Production
Uri was announced by producer Ronnie Screwvala one year after the surgical strike in September 2017. The film was to be directed by debutant Aditya Dhar. He said that the film is "the story of what was imagined to have happened in those eleven days." The principal photography began in June 2018 and was finished in September. Kaushal went through extensive military training for five months and gained weight. He trained for five hours a day and three to four hours of military training to enhance stamina. He also received gun training at the naval base in Cuffe Parade in Mumbai. He called it "physically the most challenging film for me". He injured his arm while filming an action sequence in it.

Kaushal and the supporting cast trained at Mumbai's Navy Nagar with Captains and Majors teaching them slithering, using arms and ammunitions and other drills used by the armed forces. Uri was largely shot in Serbia and was wrapped up in Mumbai. The Indo-Pak border, the LOC and other areas resembling military posts and terrorist camps were recreated in Serbia. Yami Gautam underwent mixed martial arts training. She called the process of shooting as "exhausting yet enjoyable." The film also stars Paresh Rawal, Mohit Raina, Ivan Rodrigues and Kirti Kulhari. Screwvala said that the film has elements of "war, action, and strategy based on a true story" that the "Indian audience is yet to watch such experience in cinema."

Marketing and release 
The film was released on 11 January 2019. The film was digitally premiered on ZEE5 Platform on 19 March 2019. To curtail piracy, the makers of Uri: The Surgical Strike deployed a 3.8 gigabyte fake version of the film over networks like torrent. However, the film was leaked by the bootleg website Tamil Rockers within a week of release. The Telugu dubbed version of the film was released with the same name on 14 June 2019.

Soundtrack 

The film score and songs were composed and produced by Shashwat Sachdev. Kumaar, Raj Shekhar and Abhiruchi Chand are the lyricists.

Reception

Critical response 
On Rotten Tomatoes, the film has an approval rating of  based on  reviews. Namrata Joshi, writing for  The Hindu, stated: "Whichever side of the political divide one may stand, one can't dismiss Dhar's canniness and craft and Vicky Kaushal as the Army officer was brilliant."
Amman Khurana of Times Now News, giving 4 stars out of 5, comments: "Uri: The Surgical Strike is a rather mature film. It somehow knows that it is catering to the viewer that is tired of watching the men in uniform who thump their chests to show their love and passion for the country." He further has to say: "The stunning cinematography and the VFX work ensure that Uri: The Surgical Strike does not pass off as a comic-book account of the operation." He concludes: "Uri: The Surgical Strike is a good one-time watch. If not for anything else, watch it for Vicky Kaushal, who brings the right amount of intensity to his role and drives the film from start to finish." Taran Adarsh rated the film 4 stars out of 5, says "Uri is one film that *should* be watched… Absorbing screenplay, superbly executed combat scenes, efficient direction Aditya Dhar… Uri is thrilling, gripping, instils patriotism, without getting jingoistic." Rajeev Masand of News 18 gave the film 4 out of 5 stars and said, "Vicky Kaushal is in especially good form as the protagonist, looking every bit the army man. He brings both the bulked-up physicality and the sort of steely determination that the part requires."

Anupama Chopra of Film Companion said, "The film alternates between fact and fiction, between gritty re-creations of combat and Top Gun-style, slow-motion shots of soldiers getting out of helicopters. For the first half, Aditya manages this tight-rope walk efficiently, aided by the strong work of DOP Mitesh Mirchandani. The story-telling has the scale and the narrative beats are predictable but satisfying", but found the plot simplistic in places. Raja Sen of Hindustan Times gave the film 3.5 out of 5 stars and said, "Uri is a very good looking film — though the cinematographer appears to have been told to highlight the lens-flare in every single shot of nighttime combat — and while the action is totally brilliant."

Box office 
Uri: The Surgical Strike in opening weekend earned 35.73 crore from domestic circuit. In the first week, the film collected 70.94 crore from India.

It took 15 days to gross  ( million) and in its fourth week of release, it grossed  ( million). It took seven weeks to gross  ( million) worldwide.

Uri: The Surgical Strike is the 5th highest-grossing Bollywood film of 2019. Based on box office collection, the film became the tenth highest-grossing film by 5 March 2019 produced in Bollywood until that date.

Awards and nominations

Impact
The protagonist (played by Kaushal) in the film asks his squad "How's the Josh?" (Hinglish for "How's the spirit?") The squad replies "High, Sir!". This question is asked to the cadets in military academies in India to test their enthusiasm. The dialogue went viral over Indian social media and eventually became a cultural phenomenon.  

The dialogue was quoted by several individuals and institutions. The Indian Prime Minister Narendra Modi, while inaugurating the National Museum of Indian Cinema of Films Division of India in Mumbai, asked this question at the beginning of his address to the film fraternity attending the ceremony. The Indian Cricket Team, after winning ODI series in New Zealand, raised the morale of the team by asking "How’s the Josh?" for the coming Twenty20 series; and Mumbai Police used the slogan to raise awareness about cybersecurity.

References

External links
 
 Uri: The Surgical Strike on Bollywood Hungama
 
 Uri Surgical Strike 

2010s Hindi-language films
Films scored by Shashwat Sachdev
2010s action war films
2019 action drama films
Indian action war films
Indian action drama films
Films set in 2016
2019 films
Films about military personnel
Indian Army in films
Films shot in Russia
Films shot in Serbia
Films shot in Belgrade
Cultural depictions of Narendra Modi
Films about terrorism in India
Films shot in Jammu and Kashmir
Indian nonlinear narrative films
Kashmir conflict in films
Films based on Indo-Pakistani wars and conflicts
Films about the Research and Analysis Wing
Military of Pakistan in films
Uri, Jammu and Kashmir
Films whose director won the Best Director National Film Award
Films that won the Best Audiography National Film Award
Films about insurgency in Northeast India
Films set in Delhi
Films set in Jammu and Kashmir
Films set in Azad Kashmir
Chandel, Manipur